Chettu Kinda Pleader is a 1989 Indian Telugu-language comedy thriller film directed by Vamsy. It stars Rajendra Prasad, Kinnera, Urvashi. The film was produced by Nandigam Surya Ravindra under the Siri Cine Chitra banner. The music was composed by Ilaiyaraaja. The film is a remake of the Malayalam film Thanthram (1988),

Plot
Gopala Krishna (Sarath Babu) a self-made businessman leads a very happy family life with his wife Sujatha (Urvashi) & son Nani (Baby Raasi). He has conflicts with his Step father Sarabhayya (Gollapudi Maruti Rao), that why he keeps him away. Unfortunately, Gopala Krishna dies in a car accident. After his death, Sarabhayya files a case in the court that Sujatha is not Gopala Krishna's wife and she should hand over the property. No reputable lawyer accepts the case when an advocate Balaraju (Rajendra Prasad) without practice takes up the case. But Sarabhayya destroys all the proofs which show that Sujatha is Gopala Krishna's wife and his henchmen twice strike Balaraju very badly. In the beginning, frightened Balaraju decides to leave the case but after some time, seeing the situation of Sujatha he gets back. Now comedy crime thriller begins, Balaraju segregates all the proofs against Sarabhayya with help of his cousin Krishna Kumari (Kinnera). In that process, Balaraju faces many obstacles but he succeeds in unfolding the mystery behind Gopala Krishna's death that he was murdered by Sarabhayya who is, in fact, his step-father. Meanwhile, Sarabhayya kidnaps Sujatha & Nani, and Balaraju rescues them and sees the end of Sarabhayya. Finally, the movie ends on a happy note with the marriage of Balaraju & Krishna Kumari.

Cast

Rajendra Prasad as Balaraju
Kinnera as Krishna Kumari
Urvashi as Sujatha
Gollapudi Maruti Rao as Sarabhayya
Sarath Babu as Gopala Krishna
Pradeep Shakthi as Lawyer Basavaraju
Mallikarjuna Rao as Yesupadam
Tanikella Bharani as Paata Samanlavaadu
Vijayachander as Father Cabriyal
Raavi Kondala Rao
Devadas kanakala as Bhagavantam
Krishna Bhagavan as Aadibabu
Arun Kumar as Raja Shekaram
Bheema Raju as Inspector
Jeeva as Goon
Baby Raasi as Nani

Crew
Art: Peketi 
Choreography: Siva Shankar
Fights: PM Mustaffa
Dialogues: Tanikella Bharani
Lyrics: Sirivennela Sitarama Sastry, Jonnavithhula Ramalingeswara Rao, Vennelakanti
Playback: SP Balu, Chitra
Music: Ilaiyaraaja
Editing: Anil Malnad
Cinematography: Hari Anumolu
Producer: Nandigam Surya Ravindra
Screenplay - Director: Vamsy
Banner: Siri Cine Chitra
Release Date: 16 February 1989

Soundtrack

Music composed by Ilaiyaraaja. Music released on ECHO Audio Company. The song Chalthika Naam Gaadi reused Chinnamani Kuyile from Amman Kovil Kizhakale.

References

1989 films
Films scored by Ilaiyaraaja
Films directed by Vamsy
1980s Telugu-language films
Telugu remakes of Malayalam films